Chuvash-Kubovo (Sıwaş-Qobaw) is a rural locality (a selo) and the administrative centre of Chuvash-Kubovsky Selsoviet, Iglinsky District, Bashkortostan, Russia. The population was 1,602 as of 2010. There are 29 streets.

Geography 
Chuvash-Kubovo is located on the left bank of the Lobovka River, 13 km northeast of Iglino (the district's administrative centre) by road. Kurshaki is the nearest rural locality.

References 

Rural localities in Iglinsky District